Carluddon is a hamlet north of St Austell and southeast of Stenalees in Cornwall, England. It is in the civil parish of Treverbyn.

References

Hamlets in Cornwall